Douglastown is a hamlet in Kinnettles in Angus, Scotland, three miles south-west of Forfar.  It takes its name from the landowner who in about 1789 provided land for James Ivory & Co. (in which Mr Douglas was a partner) to build a flax mill to spin yarn for heavy linen cloth called osnabruks (named from the German town of Osnabruk, where it was originally made.  The hamlet of Douglastown was built to house the workers.  The mill closed in 1834.  It used flax-spinning technology invented by John Kendrew and Thomas Porthouse of Darlington, patented in 1787.

References

Further reading
A. J. Wardey, The linen trade: ancient and modern (1864; repr. 1967), 458 511 689–91.

Villages in Angus, Scotland